Knightia excelsa, commonly called rewarewa (from Māori), is an evergreen tree endemic to the low elevation and valley forests of New Zealand's North Island and Marlborough Sounds (41° S) and the type species for the genus Knightia.

Rewarewa grows to 30 m tall, with a slender crown. The leaves are alternate, leathery, narrow oblong, 10 – 15 cm long and 2.5 - 3.5 cm wide, and without stipules. The flowers are 2 - 3.5 cm long, bright red, and borne in racemes 10 cm long. Produces dry woody follicles.

It was called New Zealand honeysuckle by early European settlers but the name has fallen into disuse in preference for the Māori name. Rewarewa flowers are a great source for honey production.

The rewarewa is noted for its timber, which is handsomely figured for interior work although not durable in exposed situations.

References

External links

Proteaceae
Trees of New Zealand
Flora of the North Island
Trees of mild maritime climate